Brain Powerd is an anime television series directed by Yoshiyuki Tomino. The series is set on a future, decimated Earth after the discovery of a mysterious, alien spacecraft dubbed "Orphan". A group of researchers scour the planet for Orphan's disc plates using mecha called "Antibodies" in order to revive the craft, an event that would result in the utter destruction of all lifeforms on Earth. The protagonists Yu Isami and Hime Utsumiya must utilize a special Antibody called "Brain Powerd" to counter the Orphan plans and save humanity.

Brain Powerd was produced by Sunrise. The 26 episodes of the series aired weekly on Japan's satellite channel WOWOW from April 8 to November 11, 1998. The series also aired on the Japanese Animax and the Bandai Channel. Bandai first released the series on DVD in two halves on June 25, 1999 and September 25, 1999 as the Brain Powerd Perfect Box. Seven individual DVDs containing fewer episodes of the series each were released from July 25 to September 25, 2002. A "remastered" box set was released on August 24, 2007. Finally, Bandai released the entire series on DVD as Emotion the Best: Brain Powerd on April 7, 2011.

The English-dubbed version of Brain Powerd premiered on Animax in South Asia and Southeast Asia. In late 2000, Bandai Entertainment acquired the rights to distribute a dub in North America under the title Brain Powered. As with Silent Möbius, the first few episodes were released on VHS in the region as test marketing for the show. Three separate bilingual DVD sets were later released from May 21 to September 24, 2002. On April 26, 2006, the company released the entire series as Anime Legends: Brain Powered Complete Collection.

The music for Brain Powerd was composed by Yoko Kanno. The series features one opening theme, "In My Dream", written and performed by Eri Shingyōji, and one ending theme, composed and arranged by Kanno, with lyrics written by Rin Iogi (a pseudonym for Tomino), and performed by Kokia.



Episode list

References

Brain Powerd